Taras Hunczak (born on March 13, 1932, in Staremiasto, near Tarnopol, Poland, now Ternopil Oblast, Ukraine) is a historian, and professor emeritus at Rutgers University in Newark, New Jersey. He lectures in Ukrainian, Russian, and East-European history. Hunczak has written extensively on Ukrainian history, the twentieth century in particular. He has also had involvement with the United Nations, notably moderating a discussion panel at an event marking the 20th anniversary of the fall of the Berlin Wall.

Education
Hunczak earned his B.A. (1955) and M.A. (1958) from Fordham University in Bronx, New York City. In 1965, he earned his Ph.D. at the Vienna University. He received an honorary doctorate from the National University of Kyiv-Mohyla Academy in 2013.

Career
Hunczak began lecturing at Rutgers University in 1960 and retired after a notable 44-year career with the institution. He also served as Chairman of the History Department and was a member of the Rutgers University Senate between 1960 and 1984.

During his career he established and coordinated the men’s volleyball program at Rutgers-Newark in 1975. Established as a club team, which through his leadership shortly became a Division I Varsity Team. His team won the East Coast Championship and placed second in the NAIA National Championship in 1976. 

Because of Hunczak’s incredible accomplishments as a team coach, Rutgers gained both national and international recognition. They were invited to play an invitational tournament in Holland. 

Taras Hunczak developed a successful Women’s Team in 1977, which also became a Varsity team within a short period of time. 

Taras, who coached and coordinated both teams, served as the United States Volleyball Commissioner of the Garden-Empire Region in New York and New Jersey from 1978 to 1980. He also served as the New Jersey vice-chairman of the National Junior Olympics of the AAU. 

Hunczak became Professor Emeritus in 2004 and was inducted into the Rutgers Hall of Fame the same year for his numerous accomplishments.

From 1991, Hunczak has been a professor at the National Taras Shevchenko University of Kyiv. In 2013, he received an honorary doctorate from the National University of Kyiv-Mohyla Academy.

Hunczak is currently retired with his wife, Olga Hunczak.

Publications
Hunczak's publications in English include: 
 Russian Imperialism from Ivan the Great to the Revolution; 
 The Ukraine, 1917-1921: A Study in Revolution; 
 On the Horns of a Dilemma: The Story of the Ukrainian Division Halychyna;
 Symon Petliura and the Jews: A reappraisal (Ukrainian Jewish studies);
  Ukraine: The Challenges of World War II

Hunczak's publications in Ukrainian include: 
 Ukraina—persha polovyna XX stolittia: Narysy politychnoi istorii;
 Symon Petliura ta ievrei; 
  U mundyrakh voroha

References

1932 births
Living people
People from Ternopil Oblast
People from Tarnopol Voivodeship
20th-century Ukrainian historians
21st-century American historians
21st-century American male writers
Fordham University alumni
Rutgers University faculty
American male non-fiction writers